KBOL-LP (100.1 FM) was a low-power FM non-commercial radio station, which broadcast an urban contemporary music format. Licensed to Waterloo, Iowa, United States, the station was owned by The Community Outreach, Inc.

History
The Federal Communications Commission issued a construction permit for the station on August 5, 2002. The station was assigned the KBOL-LP call sign on September 3, 2002, and received its license to cover on October 19, 2005. The station's license expired February 1, 2021.

References

}

BOL-LP
Radio stations established in 2005
Urban contemporary radio stations in the United States
Waterloo, Iowa
BOL-LP
2005 establishments in Iowa
Defunct radio stations in the United States
Radio stations disestablished in 2021
2021 disestablishments in Iowa
Defunct mass media in Iowa